Groovin' with Buddy Tate is an album by saxophonist Buddy Tate which was recorded in 1961 and released on the Swingville label.

Reception

Scott Yanow of AllMusic states, "With a robust yet nuanced style, similar to his peers such as Ben Webster and Lester Young, Tate sounds as comfortable on laid-back vehicles such as "I'm Just a Lucky So and So" and "East of the Sun"".

Track listing
 "Blues for Trixie" (Buck Clayton) – 7:15	
 "The Salt Mines" (Clark Terry) – 4:23	
 "I'm Just a Lucky So-and-So" (Duke Ellington, Mack David) – 6:46	
 "East of the Sun" (Brooks Bowman) – 7:08	
 "Makin' Whoopee" (Walter Donaldson, Gus Kahn) – 5:24	
 "Board Walk" (Terry) – 4:04	
 "Overdrive" (Buddy Tate) – 4:02

Personnel
Buddy Tate – tenor saxophone, clarinet
Ronnell Bright – piano
Wally Richardson – guitar
George Tucker – bass
Roy Brooks – drums

References

Buddy Tate albums
1961 albums
Swingville Records albums
Albums recorded at Van Gelder Studio
Albums produced by Esmond Edwards